The 2013 FKF President's Cup (known as the GOtv Shield for sponsorship reasons) is the 42nd season of Kenya's top domestic cup competition. It began on 20 July and ended on 17 November, with domestic broadcasting rights for the competition held by SuperSport.

After beating rivals and 2013 Kenyan Premier League champions Gor Mahia in the final, A.F.C. Leopards will represent Kenya in the preliminary round of the 2014 CAF Confederation Cup and will play Gor Mahia again at the 2014 Kenyan Super Cup.

Teams

Bracket

First round
First round ties were played from 20 July to 28 July. 32 teams from FKF Division One, the Kenyan Provincial League, the Kenyan County League and the Kenyan District League combined began their campaigns at this stage.

Second round
The draw for the second round of the tournament was held on 7 August 2013 in central Nairobi.

Third round
The third round of the tournament will be played on the weekend of 21–22 September 2013.

Of the 16 teams that advanced from the second round, only Finlays Horticulture and Kariobangi Sharks are from Division One, while the rest are from the Premier League. No Provincial League side made it through the second round.

Quarter-finals
The quarter-finals of the tournament were played on the weekend of 12–13 October 2013. All matches were played at the Nyayo National Stadium in Nairobi.

Of the 8 teams that advanced from the third round, Finlays Horticulture was the only remaining FKF Division One side in the tournament. The other 7 clubs were from the Premier League.

Semi-finals
The semi-finals were played on the weekend of 19–20 October at the Moi International Sports Centre in Kasarani.

Controversy followed the match between Gor Mahia and Sony Sugar when fans of the former invaded the match to attack the latter while celebrating the win. Goalkeeper Wycliffe Kasaya and other players were injured in the fray and admitted to hospital later on.

Third place playoff
The third place playoff was played on 16 November 2013 at the Nairobi City Stadium.

Final

The final was played on Sunday 17 November at the Nyayo National Stadium. It was the final Nairobi derby match of the season. Noah Wafula was named Man of the Match and Player of the Tournament after the game.

References

See also
 2013 Kenyan Premier League
 2013 Kenyan Super Cup (pre-season)
 2013 Kenyan Super Cup (post-season)

FKF President's Cup seasons
Cup
2013 domestic association football cups